Alternanthera nahui, common name nahui,  is a species in the family Amaranthaceae, native to New Zealand and to Norfolk Island.

Description
It is a perennial herb that has a slender tap root. Its stems are 1.5–3.0 mm in diameter and tend to lie down. It can be distinguished from Alternanthera sessilis by its narrower leaves, its keeled tepals, its shorter staminodes and style.

Taxonomy
It was first described in 2009 by Peter Heenan, Peter de Lange and J. Keeling.

Synonymy
There are no synonyms according to Plants of the World Online.  However, according to NZPCN it has, from time to time, been incorrectly referred as Alternanthera sessilis (L.) Roem. & Schult.

Habitat
It is a coastal and lowland species found in both seasonally and permanently wet habitats.

Conservation status
In the 2018 conservation assessment of de Lange and others under the New Zealand Threat Classification System it was classed as "Not Threatened", having a "large, stable population".

References

External links
Alternanthera nahui occurrence data from Australasian Virtual Herbarium

nahui
Flora of New Zealand
Flora of Norfolk Island
Taxa named by Peter Brian Heenan
Taxa named by Peter James de Lange
Plants described in 2009